Vajont is a 2001 Italian disaster film directed by Renzo Martinelli. It is a dramatization of the Vajont Dam. For his performance Leo Gullotta won a Nastro d'Argento for Best Supporting Actor.

Cast
 Michel Serrault: Carlo Semenza
 Daniel Auteuil: Alberico Biadene
 Laura Morante: Tina Merlin
 Jorge Perugorría: Geom. Olmo Montaner
 Mauro Corona: Pietro Corona
 Anita Caprioli: Ancilla Teza
 Leo Gullotta: Mario Pancini
 Philippe Leroy:  Giorgio Dal Piaz
 Jean-Christophe Brétigniere: Edoardo Semenza
 Nicola Di Pinto: Francesco Penta
 Valerio Massimo Manfredi: President of the Court

References

External links
 

2001 films
Italian disaster films
Italian drama films
2001 drama films
Films directed by Renzo Martinelli
Films set in 1963
Disaster films based on actual events
Films set in Friuli-Venezia Giulia
2000s disaster films
2000s Italian films